Rārangi is a very small town in the South Island of New Zealand which is approximately 15 minutes drive to the north-east of Blenheim, on the coast of Cloudy Bay.

A macron was officially added to the name in May 2021.

Demographics
It is included in the Tuamarina statistical area.

Rārangi had a population of 672 at the 2018 New Zealand census, an increase of 96 people (16.7%) since the 2013 census, and an increase of 180 people (36.6%) since the 2006 census. There were 261 households. There were 330 males and 345 females, giving a sex ratio of 0.96 males per female, with 120 people (17.9%) aged under 15 years, 84 (12.5%) aged 15 to 29, 348 (51.8%) aged 30 to 64, and 123 (18.3%) aged 65 or older.

Ethnicities were 92.4% European/Pākehā, 12.5% Māori, 2.7% Pacific peoples, 0.9% Asian, and 2.7% other ethnicities (totals add to more than 100% since people could identify with multiple ethnicities).

Although some people objected to giving their religion, 66.5% had no religion, 22.3% were Christian, 0.4% were Buddhist and 2.7% had other religions.

Of those at least 15 years old, 108 (19.6%) people had a bachelor or higher degree, and 93 (16.8%) people had no formal qualifications. The employment status of those at least 15 was that 297 (53.8%) people were employed full-time, 90 (16.3%) were part-time, and 15 (2.7%) were unemployed.

References 

Populated places in the Marlborough Region